Legnotus picipes is a species of true bug belonging to the family Cydnidae.

It is native to Europe.

References

Cydnidae